Bastiaan Jacob Dirk Meeuse  (9 May 1916 – 27 July 1999) was a botanist and naturalist.

References

1916 births
1999 deaths
20th-century American botanists
American naturalists
Delft University of Technology alumni
Academic staff of the Delft University of Technology
20th-century Dutch botanists
Dutch emigrants to the United States
Dutch naturalists
20th-century Dutch naturalists
Leiden University alumni
People from Sukabumi
University of Washington faculty